Dimitri Leslie Roger (born July 13, 1992), professionally known as Rich the Kid, is an American rapper. He released his debut studio album, The World Is Yours, on March 30, 2018. His second studio album, The World Is Yours 2, was released on March 22, 2019, and his third studio album, Boss Man, on March 13, 2020.

Early life 
Dimitri Leslie Roger was born in Queens, New York City, on July 13, 1992. He is of Haitian descent and grew up speaking Haitian Creole fluently. After his parents' divorce, Roger moved with his mother to College Park, Georgia when he was 13.

Rich the Kid said he grew up listening to Nas, Jay-Z, 2Pac, Notorious B.I.G. & 50 Cent, but after moving to College Park, he started listening to T.I. and Young Jeezy. His first rap name was Black Boy Da Kid, but later changed it to Rich the Kid. He attended Elmont Memorial Junior – Senior High School in Elmont, New York.

Career 
In 2013, he released his debut solo mixtape, Been About the Benjamins, and later that year released a collaborative mixtape series with Migos called Streets On Lock (volume 1 and 2), with volume 3 being released in 2014 and volume 4 being released in 2015. His second solo mixtape titled Feels Good 2 Be Rich was released in August 2014, and featured artists Migos, Young Thug, Kirko Bangz, Rockie Fresh, Stalley, Soulja Boy, RiFF RaFF, Jeremih, K Camp, Young Dolph, Yo Gotti, French Montana, Chinx & Kodak Black. In November 2014, Rich the Kid released the single "On My Way" featuring GS9 artists, Bobby Shmurda & Rowdy Rebel. In December 2014, he released his third mixtape Rich Than Famous which featured YG, Migos, Bobby Shmurda, Rowdy Rebel, Gucci Mane, Johnny Cinco and PeeWee Longway.

Rich the Kid's first release in 2015 was a collaborative mixtape titled Still On Lock with Migos. In August 2015, he released Flexin' on Purpose. The 14-track project featured collaborations with Master P, Young Dolph, Ty Dolla $ign, Fetty Wap and Rich Homie Quan. In October 2015, he released Streets On Lock 4 with Migos with features from Jose Guapo, Skippa Da Flippa, Hoodrich Pablo Juan, Lil Duke, 2 Chainz, Jeezy, Waka Flocka, Young Dolph, PeeWee Longway, Mango Foo, Slim Jxmmi, iLoveMakonnen, Tray1, Migo Domingo, Migo Jerz, YRN Lingo and Young Greatness. Rich the Kid and iLoveMakonnen released Whip It, featuring 8 tracks on Thanksgiving Day, November 26, 2015, with guest spots from Rome Fortune, Migos, T-Wayne and Key!. The next month Dabbin' Fever was released on Christmas Eve 2015, with features from Wiz Khalifa, Migos, Skippa Da Flippa, 21 Savage, ManMan Savage, Jose Guapo, Playboi Carti, Kodak Black and Curren$y. He released his Trap Talk mixtape in April 2016, which features 21 Savage, Ty Dolla $ign, Playboi Carti, Kodak Black, Migos, Famous Dex and PartyNextDoor. In October 2016, he released his mixtape Keep Flexin' which featured Desiigner, Migos, Famous Dex, Jeremih, Young Thug and Playboi Carti. In May 2017, he collaborated as a featured artist on the Diplo song, "Bankroll", which also features Rich Brian and Young Thug (the song originally featured Justin Bieber instead of Rich Brian).

On June 9, 2017, Rich the Kid announced that he had signed to Interscope Records. In an interview with XXL, Roger talked about his decision on signing with Interscope:

I was talking to different labels, Columbia, RCA, Epic, I decided not to sign with Epic even after L.A. Reid offered me a crazy deal. [Senior Vice President of A&R at Interscope] Manny Smith & Interscope CEO John Janick understand me and my vision for myself and also my label. Interscope gave me the opportunity to take over the game completely and that's what I'm going to do.

Rich the Kid released the single "New Freezer" featuring Kendrick Lamar on September 26, 2017. The song was certified Platinum on March 27, 2018, by the RIAA. His debut studio album, The World Is Yours, was released on March 30, 2018, and features guest appearances from Lil Wayne, Swae Lee, Quavo, Offset, Trippie Redd, Khalid, Kendrick Lamar, Rick Ross, Future, Jay Critch and Chris Brown with its second single, "Plug Walk" peaking at number 13 on the Billboard Hot 100. His second album, The World Is Yours 2 was released a year later, on March 22, 2019. It debuted at number four on the US Billboard 200, marking his second US top 10 album.
On December 6, 2019, it was announced that Rich the Kid departed Interscope Records and signed with Republic Records, while still remaining under the UMG umbrella. He kept with the tradition of March-releases, with his third album Boss Man being released on March 13, 2020, and subsequently marking Rich's first release on Republic Records. He then signed to independent label, Empire Distribution and released his first project with them, Nobody Safe, a collaborative mixtape with YoungBoy Never Broke Again.

On April 14, 2021, Rich the Kid signed a multi-million dollar deal with Rostrum Records.

On October 1, 2021, Rich released Trust Fund Babies, a collaborative mixtape with Lil Wayne.

On March 4, 2022, Rich was featured on Jungle, the first single from Bored Ape Yacht Club DJ/producer duo Escape Plan.

On November 14, 2022, Rich the Kid signed with RCA Records. He also released a new single called "Motion".

Personal life 
Roger was married to Antonette Willis and has two children with her. In March 2018, Willis filed for divorce, seeking full physical custody while giving Roger visitation rights and joint legal custody. Willis is also seeking spousal support. This was shortly after Willis accused him of cheating on her with Blac Chyna and India Love, even alleging that he was in a relationship with the former. Willis later claimed that Roger abused her and forced her to have abortions regularly, saying it was commonplace for police to be called to their residence for domestic abuse.

Roger began dating Tori Hughes (professionally known as Tori Brixx) shortly following the filing of the divorce. On June 15, 2018, Roger was hospitalized following a home invasion at Hughes' home. According to a police report, several men entered Hughes' home carrying firearms and demanded money. When Roger attempted to confront them, he was beaten by them and the men left with a "significant" amount of money and jewelry. On December 29, 2018, Rich the Kid got into a UTV accident in Calabasas, CA, when Dimitri and his friend were driving around in a Polaris RZR 4-wheeler. Based on sources from TMZ, it seems that Dimitri lost control of it and fell off of his RZR 4-wheeler and severely injured his hand. He was taken to the hospital shortly after. In February 2019, he was robbed and shot at outside of the Westlake Recording Studio in West Hollywood, California.

Feuds

Lil Uzi Vert 
Rich the Kid and Lil Uzi Vert's feud started on Twitter following a highly publicized label issue Lil Uzi Vert had with DJ Drama's Generation Now imprint in January 2018. Rich the Kid tweeted at Lil Uzi Vert, offering them a position in his imprint Rich Forever Music, in which Uzi replied "Boy I'm not signing for 20 racks". A month later on February 9, 2018, Rich The Kid said that he and Lil Uzi Vert had "personal issues". On February 27, 2018, Rich the Kid previewed a diss track directed at Lil Uzi Vert titled "Dead Friends" with production from DJ Mustard.

On March 26, 2018, Rich the Kid formally released "Dead Friends". Following the release of "Dead Friends", Rich the Kid said he thought Lil Uzi Vert would not respond. Uzi later responded on their SoundCloud with "Rich Forever Leaked" over the Chief Keef "Where" instrumental, to which Rich the Kid responded by saying "Fuck that nigga."
On June 2, 2018, Rich the Kid and Lil Uzi Vert confronted each other at a Starbucks in Philadelphia. The former ran from the latter shortly after. Videos of the altercation were posted online on social media.

Discography 

 The World Is Yours (2018)
 The World Is Yours 2 (2019)
 Boss Man (2020)

Rich Forever Music 

In March 2016, Rich the Kid started his own record label called Rich Forever Music. The label's first artist signed up was Chicago based Famous Dex. He also signed his first producer to Rich Forever Music, The Lab Cook. In April 2016, Rich the Kid signed his second artist, rapper J $tash.

The record label's first release was a 15-track compilation titled Rich Forever Music, and featured Offset, Skippa Da Flippa, Lil Yachty and OG Maco. Shortly after the release, J $tash parted ways with the label.

In June 2016, Rich the Kid signed a deal to have 300 Entertainment become a parent company for Rich Forever Music.

On July 4, 2016, Rich Forever Music released their second project Rich Forever 2, a collaborative mixtape between Rich the Kid and Famous Dex, with appearances from Wiz Khalifa, Lil Yachty, Young Thug, Jaden Smith and Playboi Carti. In November 2016, Rich the Kid signed Brooklyn rapper Jay Critch to his label.

On March 17, 2017, the label released their third compilation mixtape The Rich Forever Way. The label released their fourth compilation Rich Forever 3 on June 16, 2017.

In February 2018, Rich the Kid signed Texas rapper YBN Almighty Jay to his label. In March 2018, YBN Almighty Jay and Rich the Kid had a fall out when Rich the Kid released a song called Back Quick without YBN Almighty Jay's permission. In April 2018, YBN Almighty Jay did an interview with DJ Akademiks saying he was never signed with the label.

In May 2018, Famous Dex stated he had left Rich Forever Music, and is an independent artist, but Rich the Kid made a post through the label's Instagram saying he is still signed to the label.

References

Further reading 
Rising Star Rich The Kid Explains How To Make Money As A Rapper, Forbes.

External links 

1992 births
Living people
American rappers of Haitian descent
People from Queens, New York
Rappers from Atlanta
Rappers from New York City
Songwriters from Georgia (U.S. state)
Songwriters from New York (state)
Trap musicians
Interscope Records artists
Quality Control artists
Republic Records artists
Southern hip hop musicians
Mumble rappers
21st-century American rappers
21st-century American male musicians
African-American male rappers
21st-century African-American musicians
African-American male songwriters